The Bhumij Rebellion or Bhumij Revolt, also known as Ganga Narain's Hungama was a revolt during 1832–1833 by Bhumij tribals based in the Dhalbhum and Jungle Mahal areas of the Midnapore district of the erstwhile Bengal state. It was led by Ganga Narayan Singh. 

The British have called it "Ganga Narayan's Hungama" while historians have also written it as the Chuar rebellion.

Barabhum Raj 
Raja Vivek Narayan Singh of Barabhum had two queens. Two queens had two sons. After the death of King Vivek Narayan in the 18th century, there was a struggle for successor between two sons Lakshman Narayan Singh and Raghunath Narayan Singh.

According to the traditional Bhumij system, Lakshman Narayan Singh, the son of the elder queen, was the only successor as per their custom, as the king. But a long family dispute started after the British nominated Raghunath Narayan, the son of the younger queen as king. The local Bhumij Sardar used to support Laxman Narayan. But he could not stand in front of the British support and military aid received by Raghunath. Laxman Singh was evicted from the state. Laxman Singh was abolished the Jagir of Bandhdih village for his livelihood. Where his job was only to take care of Bandhadih Ghat. Laxman Singh struggled to get back his Zamindari rights. Ganga Narayan Singh, son of Lakshman Narayan Singh later revolted against the British East India Company.

Rebellion 
Ganga Narayan was the first leader to fight against the British rule and exploitation policy, who first formed the Sardar Gorilla Vahini Sena. On which there was support of every caste. Jirpa Laya was appointed as the chief commander of the army. Dhalbhum, Patkum, Shikharbhum, Singhbhum, Panchet, Jhalda, Vamani, Baghmundi, Manbhum, Ambika Nagar, Amiyapur, Shyamsunderpur, Phulkusma, Raipur and Kashipur's Raja-Maharaja and Zamindars supported Ganga Narayan Singh. Ganga Narayan attacked and killed the Diwan of Barabhum and British broker Madhab Singh in Vandih on April 2, 1832 AD. After that, along with Sardar Vahini, the court of Barabazar Muffasil, the office of salt inspector and the police station were handed over to the front.

The Collector of Bankura, Russell, arrived to arrest Ganga Narayan. But the Sardar Vahini army surrounded him from all sides. All the English army were killed. But Russell somehow escaped to Bankura after saving his life. This movement of Ganga Narayan took the form of a storm, which trampled the British regiments in Chhatna, Jhalda, Akro, Ambika Nagar, Shyamsundarpur, Raipur, Phulkusma, Shilda, Kuilapal and various places in Bengal. The impact of his movement was vigorous in places like Purulia, Bardhman, Medinipur and Bankura in Bengal, entire Chotanagpur in Bihar (now Jharkhand ), Mayurbhanj, Keonjhar and Sundergarh in Orissa. As a result, the entire Jungle Mahal was out of the control of the British. Everyone started supporting Ganga Narayan as a true honest, heroic, patriot and social worker.

Eventually the British had to send an army from Barrackpore Cantonment, which was sent under the leadership of Lieutenant Colonel Kapoor. The army was also defeated in the conflict. After this Ganga Narayan and his followers expanded the scope of their action plan. The commissioner baton of Bardhaman and the commissioner hunt of Chotanagpur were also sent but they too could not succeed and had to face defeat in front of the Sardar Vahini army.

From August 1832 to February 1833, the entire Jungle Mahal remained disturbed at Chotanagpur in Bihar (now Jharkhand), Purulia, Bardhman, Medinipur, Bankura in Bengal, Mayurbhanj, Keonjhar and Sundergarh in Orissa. The British tried in every way to suppress Ganga Narayan Singh, but the British could not stand in front of Ganga Narain's cleverness and fighting skills. The commissioners of Bardhadman, Chotanagpur and Orissa ( Raipur ) escaped after being defeated by Ganga Narayan Singh. Thus the struggle was so fast and effective that the British were compelled to withdraw the land sale law, inheritance law, excise duty on lac, salt law, jungle law.

At that time Thakur Chetan Singh of Kharsawan was running his rule in collusion with the British. Ganga Narain went to Porahat and Singhbhum and organized the Kol (Ho) tribes there to fight against Thakur Chetan Singh and the British. On February 6, 1833, Ganga Narain attacked the Hindshahar police station of Thakur Chetan Singh of Kharsawan with the Kol (Ho) tribes, but unfortunately died on the same day while fighting against the British and the rulers till the last breath of his life.

Thus on February 7, 1833 AD, a mighty, mighty warrior who took iron against the British, the hero of the Bhumij rebellion (also Chuar rebellion), Ganga Narayan Singh, left his indelible mark and became immortal. After the Bhumij Rebellion, under the Regulation XIII of 1833, there were extensive changes in the system of governance. There was a change in the revenue policy and Chotanagpur was accepted as a part of the South-West Frontier Agency.

See also 
 Ganga Narayan Singh
 Chuar Rebellion
 Tribal revolts in India before Indian independence
 History of Jharkhand

References 

Bengal Presidency
Rebellions in India
History of Jharkhand
Rebellions by ethnic group
Bhumij
1832 in British India
1833 in British India